Collège Antoine-Girouard is a private mixed-sex high school located in Saint-Hyacinthe, Quebec, Canada.

History

It was founded in 1811 by Antoine Girouard.
 1811: Séminaire de Saint-Hyacinthe
 1970: École du Séminaire de Saint-Hyacinthe
 1992: Collège Antoine-Girouard

The school's ice hockey team is the Collège Antoine-Girouard Gaulois, playing in the Quebec AAA Midget Hockey League. The team appeared in the 2003 Air Canada Cup, coached by Mario Pouliot.

Notable alumni
 Pierre Lassonde, philanthropist and businessman
 Charles Laberge, politician
 Jean-Charles Prince, bishop
 Michael J. McGivney, founder of the Knights of Columbus
 Marc Messier, actor
 François Avard, writer
 Paul Arcand, journalist
 David La Haye, actor
 Pierre Corbeil, politician and dentist
 Bruno Gervais, hockey player
 Maxime Talbot, hockey player
 Kristopher Letang, hockey player
 Jean Cournoyer, politician

Notes

External links
 

High schools in Montérégie
Private schools in Quebec
Educational institutions established in 1811
Private subsidized colleges in Quebec
School buildings completed in 1811
Buildings and structures in Saint-Hyacinthe